Hwanggeum-dong is a ward of Dong District, Gwangju, South Korea.

References

Dong District, Gwangju
Neighbourhoods in South Korea